Terror Squad is the second album by Danish thrash metal band Artillery. It was originally released in 1987 via Neat Records.

Track listing

Personnel
Flemming Rönsdorf: vocals
Jørgen Sandau: rhythm guitar
Michael Stützer: lead guitar
Morten Stützer: bass
Carsten Nielsen: drums

Production
Arranged by Artillery
Produced by Artillery and Lars Overgaard
Recorded by Lars Overgaard, Lars Christensen and Nis Bögvad
Mixed by Artillery and Lars Christensen
All songs published by Neat Music Publishing

References

External links
 Live TV performance of the track "Terror Squad" on Youtube

Artillery (band) albums
1987 albums